is a passenger railway station located in the city of  Funabashi, Chiba Prefecture, Japan, operated by the private railway operator Shin-Keisei Electric Railway.

Lines
Takanekido Station is served by the Shin-Keisei Line, and is located 20.1 kilometers from the terminus of the line at Matsudo Station.

Station layout 
The station consists of a single island platform, with an elevated station building.

Platforms

History
Takanekido Station was opened on October 8, 1948.

Passenger statistics
In fiscal 2018, the station was used by an average of 8,509 passengers daily.

Surrounding area
 The station is located right next to the Æon market.

See also
 List of railway stations in Japan

References

External links

   Shin Keisei Railway Station information

Railway stations in Japan opened in 1948
Railway stations in Chiba Prefecture
Funabashi